Pachybrachis othonus is a species of case-bearing leaf beetle in the family Chrysomelidae. It is found in North America.

Subspecies
These three subspecies belong to the species Pachybrachis othonus:
 Pachybrachis othonus othonus (Say, 1825)
 Pachybrachis othonus pallidipennis Suffrian, 1858
 Pachybrachis othonus sioux Balsbaugh, 1973

References

Further reading

 

othonus
Articles created by Qbugbot
Beetles described in 1825